Balanerpeton is an extinct genus of temnospondyl amphibian from the Visean stage of the Early Carboniferous period. Balanerpeton woodi was discovered by Stanley Wood and is the earliest and most common tetrapod in the East Kirkton Limestone of the East Kirkton Quarry assemblage of terrestrial amphibians in Scotland. Characteristics of Balanerpeton woodi include the presence of large external nares, large interpterygoid vacuities (holes in the back of the palate), and an ear with a tympanic membrane and rod-like stapes. Numerous studies and research regarding ontogeny in non extant taxa have been oriented around this taxon. The morphology of the stapes suggests that the animal was capable of hearing high-frequency sound. B. woodi does not possess lateral line sulci or an ossified branchial system. The principal method of respiration was probably buccal (gulping air through mouth) rather than costal (expanding chest volume to take in air), indicated by the small straight ribs.

References

Dendrerpetontidae
Carboniferous temnospondyls of Europe
Prehistoric amphibian genera
Fossil taxa described in 1994